How to Commit Marriage is a 1969 American comedy film directed by Norman Panama, and starring Bob Hope, Jackie Gleason, Tina Louise, Irwin Corey, Leslie Nielsen, Tim Matheson and Jane Wyman in her final film role. It was filmed in the current version of Cinerama. A rock band entitled The Comfortable Chair appears as a rock group, performing their song "A Child's Garden."

Plot
Music student Nancy, the 19-year-old daughter of real estate broker Frank Benson and his wife Elaine, wants to marry fellow music student David, the 20-year-old son of Oliver Poe, a record producer. What the bride doesn't know is that her parents are getting a divorce. Oliver Poe is opposed to marriage and forbids the children from planning their marriage. He discovers and exposes the Bensons' secret. Nancy and David decline this unnecessary marriage. They will live together instead, traveling around the country with a rock band and heeding the advice and wisdom of a Persian mystic called the Baba Zeba. Frank and Elaine see other people. He is involved with a divorcée, Lois Grey, while she is developing an interest in Phil Fletcher, who is recently divorced. Poe meets LaVerne Baker, who becomes his live-in girlfriend. One day, Nancy finds out she is pregnant. The Baba Zeba, paid off by Oliver, persuades Nancy to put up the baby for adoption. Frank and Elaine conspire behind their daughter's back to adopt their own grandchild. Complications arise, resulting in Frank trying to bribe the Baba Zeba and disguising himself as one of the guru's followers. The Bensons are reunited, David and Nancy have a baby, and Poe and LaVerne are married.

Cast
 Bob Hope as Frank Benson
 Jackie Gleason as Oliver Poe
 Jane Wyman as Elaine Benson
 Leslie Nielsen as Phil Fletcher
 Maureen Arthur as Lois Grey
 Tina Louise as LaVerne Baker
 Tim Matheson as David Poe
 Paul Stewart as Willoughby
 Irwin Corey as the Baba Zeba
 Joanna Cameron as Nancy Benson

Release
The film grossed $145,350 on June 18, 1969.

See also
 List of American films of 1969

References

External links

1969 films
1960s English-language films
1960s pregnancy films
American independent films
Hippie films
Psychedelic rock
Films directed by Norman Panama
1969 romantic comedy films
American romantic comedy films
Cinerama Releasing Corporation films
1969 independent films
1960s American films